Justin Charles Garrett Leonard (born June 15, 1972) is an American professional golfer. He has twelve career wins on the PGA Tour, including one major, the 1997 Open Championship.

Early years
Born and raised in Dallas, Texas, Leonard graduated from Lake Highlands High School in 1990. He attended the University of Texas in Austin and was the individual NCAA champion in 1994. Leonard won the 1992 U.S. Amateur, was a two-time All-American (1993, 1994), and won the Haskins Award in 1994 as the most outstanding collegiate golfer. That same year, he became only the fourth player to go directly from college to the PGA Tour without going through Q School, following Gary Hallberg, Scott Verplank, and Phil Mickelson.

PGA Tour
Leonard's wins on the PGA Tour included one of golf's four majors, the 1997 Open Championship, as well as the 1998 Players Championship. He ranked in the top 10 of the Official World Golf Ranking for 24 weeks in 1998 and 1999. Leonard also had opportunities to win other major championships, notably at the 1999 Open Championship and the 2004 PGA Championship; in both instances he fell into a playoff with a bogey on the 72nd hole.

At the 1997 PGA Championship, Leonard was tied with Davis Love III for the 54-hole lead. Love shot a final round 66 to win by five shots over Leonard, who finished solo second. Leonard was ahead by three shots at the 54-hole mark of the 2002 PGA Championship before shooting a final round 77 and finishing tied for fourth.

Leonard qualified for the United States Ryder Cup team in 1997, 1999, and 2008. In the 1999 event, Leonard made a   putt for birdie on the 17th hole to complete a remarkable comeback by the U.S. team on the final day. The victory was somewhat marred by the celebration following Leonard's putt, when other U.S. players, their wives, and a few fans ran onto the green even though Leonard's opponent, José María Olazábal, still had an opportunity to match Leonard on the hole.

In 2015, Leonard moved to Aspen, Colorado, which is not conducive to the year-round practice of golf and began to transition to a career as a golf announcer. After using his career money list exemption for the 2015–16 season and failing to make the FedEx Cup, Leonard played the 2016–17 season with past champion status. He played in only 16 tournaments that year, his best finish being a tie for 16th at the Northern Trust Open. In 2017, he played in only one tournament, the Texas Open, where he finished in 58th.

He returned to the PGA for one event in 2022, competing in the Byron Nelson where he failed to make the cut. It was his last event before turning 50 and qualifying for the PGA Tour Champions.

Golf announcer
Leonard joined Golf Channel in 2015 as an analyst for Golf Central "Live From" and PGA Tour live tournament coverage. In 2020, he assumed an elevated role on Golf Central "Live From" as an analyst on the program's primetime shows.

Amateur wins
1992 Western Amateur, Southern Amateur, U.S. Amateur
1993 Western Amateur, Southern Amateur
1994 NCAA Division I Championship

Professional wins (13)

PGA Tour wins (12)

PGA Tour playoff record (2–5)

Other wins (1)

Other playoff record (0–1)

Major championships

Wins (1)

Results timeline

LA = Low Amateur
CUT = missed the half way cut
"T" indicates a tie for a place.

Summary

Most consecutive cuts made – 8 (1996 PGA – 1998 Open Championship)
Longest streak of top-10s – 3 (1997 Open Championship – 1998 Masters)

The Players Championship

Wins (1)

Results timeline

CUT = missed the halfway cut
"T" indicates a tie for a place.

Results in World Golf Championships

1Cancelled due to 9/11

QF, R16, R32, R64 = Round in which player lost in match play
"T" = tied
NT = No Tournament
Note that the HSBC Champions did not become a WGC event until 2009.

U.S. national team appearances
Amateur
Eisenhower Trophy: 1992
Walker Cup: 1993 (winners)

Professional
Presidents Cup: 1996 (winners), 1998, 2003 (tie), 2005 (winners), 2009  (winners)
Ryder Cup: 1997, 1999 (winners), 2008 (winners)
Dunhill Cup: 1997
World Cup: 1997, 2003
Wendy's 3-Tour Challenge (representing PGA Tour): 1998, 1999

References

External links

American male golfers
Texas Longhorns men's golfers
PGA Tour golfers
Ryder Cup competitors for the United States
Winners of men's major golf championships
Golf writers and broadcasters
Golfers from Dallas
1972 births
Living people